Widener is a surname of German origin. Notable people with the surname are as follows:

 Chris Widener (born 1963), American politician
 Chris Widener (author) (born 1966), American author and motivational speaker
 Christine Ourmières-Widener (born 1964), French businesswoman
 Eleanor Elkins Widener (c. 1862–1937), American heiress
 George Widener (born 1962), autistic savant
 George Dunton Widener (1861–1912), American businessman who died in the sinking of the Titanic
 H. Emory Widener, Jr. (1923–2007), American judge
 Harry Elkins Widener (1885–1912), American book collector who died in the sinking of the Titanic
 Jeff Widener (born 1956), American photographer
 Joseph E. Widener (1871–1943), American art collector and founding benefactor of the National Gallery of Art in Washington, D.C. 
 Peter Arrell Browne Widener (1834–1915), Philadelphia transit magnate
 Peter Arrell Browne Widener II (1895–1948), American race horse breeder and owner
 Taylor Widener (born 1994), American baseball player
 Warren Widener (1938–2013), American politician

Surnames of English origin
Surnames of German origin